Greentree Road may refer to:
County Route 674 (Camden County, New Jersey)
County Route 651 (Gloucester County, New Jersey)